The Suni (Nesotragus moschatus) is a small antelope. It occurs in dense underbrush from central Kenya to KwaZulu-Natal in South Africa.

They are usually reddish brown, darker on their back than their sides and legs. The belly, chin, throat and insides of legs are white. The nostrils are prominent red, and there are black rings around the eyes and above the hooves. Females do not have horns. Suni can make weak barking and whistling sounds.

Suni feed on leaves, fungi, fruits and flowers, and need almost no free water. They are shy, most active at night, and sleep during the day in a shady, sheltered area. They are social but males defend a territory of about three hectares. They scent-mark the boundaries with secretions from their preorbital glands. There may be an individual or communal dung pile on the periphery of the territory.  A male usually takes one mate, but other females may share his territory.  A single calf is born weighing about two pounds, after a gestation of 183 days.

Felids, raptors, snakes, and other meat-eaters prey on suni. For protection, they are well camouflaged in dry grass and keep very still. When a predator is almost on top of them, they spring out and bound away into the underbrush.

Taxonomy and etymology
The scientific name of the suni is Nesotragus moschatus. It is placed in the genus Nesotragus - along with (formerly) Bates's pygmy antelope (Nesotragus batesi) - and in the family Bovidae. The common name "suni"  is the name for this antelope in southeastern Africa. Four subspecies are identified, though these are sometimes considered to be independent species:
N. m. kirchenpaueri (Pagenstecher, 1885) 
N. m. livingstonianus (Kirk, 1865)  
N. m. moschatus (Von Dueben, 1846)  
N. m. zuluensis (Thomas, 1898)

Description
The suni is a small antelope, but larger than the other two species of its genus. This antelope resembles Bates's pygmy antelope in terms of cranial measurements.

Horns are present only on males; sexual dimorphism in the suni is less marked than in Bates's pygmy antelope.

Threats and conservation
Populations of the suni have been notably reduced due to poaching, habitat loss and predation by dogs - especially in South Africa, where it is confined mainly to the northeastern KwaZulu-Natal. Nevertheless, the antelope is known for its tolerance to heavy hunting pressure, and is listed as a species of Least Concern.

References

External links

Dwarf antelopes
Mammals of Kenya
Mammals of South Africa
Fauna of East Africa
Mammals of Zimbabwe
Mammals of Malawi
Mammals of Mozambique
Mammals of Tanzania
Mammals described in 1846